The 2021 BWF World Tour (officially known as 2021 HSBC BWF World Tour for sponsorship reasons) was the fourth season of the BWF World Tour of badminton, a circuit of 23 tournaments which led up to the World Tour Finals tournament. The 23 tournaments were divided into five levels: Level 1 is the said World Tour Finals, Level 2 called Super 1000 (three tournaments), Level 3 called Super 750 (five tournaments), Level 4 called Super 500 (six tournaments) and Level 5 called Super 300 (eight tournaments). Each of these tournaments offered different ranking points and prize money. The highest points and prize pool were offered at the Super 1000 level (including the World Tour Finals). 

One other category of tournament, the BWF Tour Super 100 (level 6), also offered BWF World Tour ranking points. Although this level was not part of the BWF World Tour, it was an important part of the pathway and entry point for players into the BWF World Tour tournaments. When the nine Level 6 grade tournaments of the BWF Tour Super 100 were included, the complete tour consists of 32 tournaments.

Results 
Below is the schedule released by the Badminton World Federation:

Key

Winners

Finals 
This is the complete schedule of events on the 2021 calendar, with the champions and runners-up documented.

January

February 
No World Tour tournaments were held in February.

March

April

May

June

July

August

September

October

November

December

Statistics

Performance by countries 
Below are the 2021 BWF World Tour performances by countries. Only countries who have won a title are listed:

 BWF World Tour

 BWF Tour Super 100

Performance by categories 
Tables were calculated after the MS final (5/5 matches) of the World Tour Finals.

Men's singles

Women's singles

Men's doubles

Women's doubles

Mixed doubles

World Tour Finals rankings 
The points are calculated from the following levels:
BWF World Tour Super 1000,
BWF World Tour Super 750, 
BWF World Tour Super 500, 
BWF World Tour Super 300,
BWF Tour Super 100.

Information on Points, Won, Lost, and % columns were calculated after the 2021 Indonesia Open.
Key

Men's singles 
The table below was based on the ranking of men's singles as of 30 November 2021.

Women's singles 
The table below was based on the ranking of women's singles as of 30 November 2021.

Men's doubles 
The table below was based on the ranking of men's doubles as of 30 November 2021.

Women's doubles 
The table below was based on the ranking of women's doubles as of 30 November 2021.

Mixed doubles 
The table below was based on the ranking of mixed doubles as of 23 November 2021.

Notes

References 

 
World Tour
BWF World Tour